Peniche may refer to:

Places
 Peniche, Portugal
 Peniche Fortress

People
 Count of Peniche, a Portuguese title
 Arturo Peniche (born 1962), Mexican actor
 Kari Ann Peniche (born 1984), American actress
 Karla Peniche (born 1988), Mexican model, TV actress and beauty pageant
 Peniche Everton Romualdo (born 1979), Brazilian footballer
 Yuliana Peniche (born 1981), Mexican actress

Other
 Peniche (fluid dynamics), material inserted between a half-model and the wall of a wind tunnel, used to reduce the effect of the boundary layer
 Péniche (barge), a French barge. Associated with the Freycinet gauge for locks in France
 G.D. Peniche, Portuguese football team

See also
 Péniche Hôtel, a type of floating hotel on a peniche
 Péniche Opéra, a French opera company based on a peniche